Bodajk FC Siófok, generally shortened to BFC Siófok, is a Hungarian football club based in Siófok, a small town on the shores of Lake Balaton. The club was founded in 1921 as Siófok SE. The word Bodajk in the club's name stems from a merger with Bodajk FC in 2005. The colours of the club are yellow and blue. BFC Siófok plays its home matches in the Révész Géza utcai Stadion which has a capacity of 10,500.

In the Hungarian cup final of 1984, BFC Siófok defeated Rába Vasas ETO Gyõr, 2–1 and thus achieved its only major success.

BFC Siófok has been a member of the first division, the Nemzeti Bajnokság I, from 1985 to 1994, 1996 to 2000, and from 2002 to 2004. After the 2006/07 season, the club was again promoted to the NB I. However, this promotion was aided by the deduction of eight points from main rivals Haladás Szombathely for their use of ineligible players.

Current squad

First team squad 
As of 9 February 2023, according to the club's official website.

Out on loan

European Cup history

UEFA Cup Winners' Cup

UEFA Intertoto Cup

Record by country of opposition
Correct as of 5 July 2010

 P – Played; W – Won; D – Drawn; L – Lost

Honours 
Magyar Kupa:
 Winners (1) :1983–84
Nemzeti Bajnokság II:
 Third place: 1994–1995
 Winners: 1995–1996
 Hungarian NB I/B, 2. Place: 2000–2001
 Hungarian NB II, Western Division Champions: 2006–2007
 Best Place in Hungarian National Championship: 4. Place (1991–1992, 2003–2004)

Naming history 
 1921–56: Siófok SE
 1956–98: Siófok Bányász SK
 1998–99: Siófoki FC
 1999: Balaton TV-Siófok FC
 1999-03: Siófoki FC
 2003–04: Balaton FC
 2004–05: Siófoki Bányász SE
 2005–06: Bodajk FC Siófok
 2006–: BFC Siófok

First Division placings 
Beginning in 1986, Siófok has participated in Hungary's top league for 17 seasons, in which they have finished in the top half only six times. Their best finish was 4th place in 1992 and 2004.

Season to season

See .

Managers
 János Csank (2002 – May 3)
 Aurél Csertői (July 2003 – June 2004)
 Gábor Hartyáni (June 2005)
 Antal Botos (July 2006 – October 2007)
 Barnabás Tornyi (October 2007 – January 2008)
 Aldo Dolcetti (January 2008 – June 2008)
 Lajos Détári (July 2008 – November 2008)
 Zoltán Aczél (January 2009 – June 2009)
 Károly Horváth (January 2010 – June 2010)
 István Mihalecz (July 2010 – June 2012) (Horváth had no UEFA pro licence until 2012, so Mihalecz acted as head coach.)
 Károly Horváth (July 2012–)

References

External links
Official Website 
Detailed international matches list

 
Football clubs in Hungary
Association football clubs established in 1921
1921 establishments in Hungary